Anderson Balbino Assis (born 19 January 1997), commonly known as Balbino, is a Brazilian footballer who plays for Al-Qasim.

Club career
After trialling with Vietnamese side Thanh Hóa in December 2019, Balbino would return to Brazil to join Veranópolis in July 2021.

He joined Esporte Clube Internacional in 2022.

Career statistics

Club

Notes

References

1997 births
Living people
Footballers from Porto Alegre
Brazilian footballers
Association football midfielders
Campeonato Brasileiro Série A players
Grêmio Foot-Ball Porto Alegrense players
Veranópolis Esporte Clube Recreativo e Cultural players
Esporte Clube Internacional players
Al-Qasim SC players
Brazilian expatriate footballers
Brazilian expatriate sportspeople in Iraq
Expatriate footballers in Iraq